Events from the year 1947 in Canada.

Incumbents

Crown 
 Monarch – George VI

Federal government 
 Governor General – the Viscount Alexander of Tunis
 Prime Minister – William Lyon Mackenzie King
 Chief Justice – Thibaudeau Rinfret (Quebec) 
 Parliament – 20th

Provincial governments

Lieutenant governors 
Lieutenant Governor of Alberta – John C. Bowen   
Lieutenant Governor of British Columbia – Charles Arthur Banks 
Lieutenant Governor of Manitoba – Roland Fairbairn McWilliams  
Lieutenant Governor of New Brunswick – David Laurence MacLaren 
Lieutenant Governor of Nova Scotia – Henry Ernest Kendall (until August 12) then J.A.D. McCurdy 
Lieutenant Governor of Ontario – Ray Lawson 
Lieutenant Governor of Prince Edward Island – Joseph Alphonsus Bernard 
Lieutenant Governor of Quebec – Eugène Fiset 
Lieutenant Governor of Saskatchewan – Reginald John Marsden Parker

Premiers 
Premier of Alberta – Ernest Manning   
Premier of British Columbia – John Hart (until December 29) then Boss Johnson  
Premier of Manitoba – Stuart Garson  
Premier of New Brunswick – John McNair 
Premier of Nova Scotia – Angus Macdonald 
Premier of Ontario – George A. Drew 
Premier of Prince Edward Island – J. Walter Jones  
Premier of Quebec – Maurice Duplessis 
Premier of Saskatchewan – Tommy Douglas

Territorial governments

Commissioners 
 Controller then Commissioner of Yukon – George A. Jeckell (until September 18) then John Edward Gibben 
 Commissioner of Northwest Territories – Charles Camsell (until January 14) then Hugh Llewellyn Keenleyside

Events
January 1 - Canadian Citizenship Act 1946 comes into effect.  Among other things this changed federal law such that Canadian women no longer lost their citizenship automatically if they married non-Canadians.
January 2 - Dominion of Newfoundland (later a province in 1949) switches to driving on the right from the left.
January 27 - The cabinet order deporting Japanese-Canadians to Japan is repealed after widespread protests.
February 13 - The oil well Leduc No. 1 comes in, launching the Alberta oil industry.
May 14 - The Chinese Immigration Act of 1923 is repealed.
June 15 - The laws limiting Asian immigration to Canada are repealed; Canadians of Asian descent are allowed to vote in federal elections.
July 22 - Two new nuclear reactors go online at the Chalk River research facility.
September 1 - Two Canadian National Railways (CNR) passenger trains collide head-on at Dugald, Manitoba, resulting in 31 people dead and 85 people injured. The disaster is exacerbated by the CNR's use of wooden passenger coaches, as strict rationing of steel during the Second World War impeded the shift to steel coaches.
September 30 - The last group of personnel who had been on active service, for World War II, since September 1, 1939, stood down.
October 1 - New letters patent defining the office and powers of the governor general come into effect.
December 29 - Boss Johnson becomes premier of British Columbia.
Stephen Leacock Award: Harry L. Symons, Ojibway Melody.

New books
Fearful Symmetry - Northrop Frye
Who Has Seen the Wind? - W.O. Mitchell

Sport 
April 19 - The Toronto Maple Leafs win their sixth Stanley Cup by defeating the Montreal Canadiens 4 games to 2. The deciding Game 6 was played in Maple Leaf Gardens in Toronto.
April 22 - The Ontario Hockey Association's Toronto St. Michael's Majors win their third (and last until 1961) Memorial Cup by defeating Southern Saskatchewan Junior Hockey League's Moose Jaw Canucks 4 games to 3. The deciding Game 7 was played at Regina Exhibition Stadium.
November 29 - The Toronto Argonauts win their eighth Grey Cup by defeating the Winnipeg Blue Bombers 10 to 9 in the 35th Grey Cup played in Varsity Stadium in Toronto. This was the last Grey Cup to be won by a team with all Canadian players.

Births

January to March
January 14 - Bill Werbeniuk, snooker player (d. 2003)
January 15 - Andrea Martin, actress and comedian
January 23 - Clayton Manness, politician
January 24 - Steve McCaffery, poet and scholar
February 10 - Louise Arbour, jurist, justice of the Supreme Court of Canada, former UN High Commissioner for Human Rights
February 11 - Abby Hoffman, track and field athlete
February 20 - Joy Smith, politician
March 1 - Alan Thicke, actor, songwriter and game and talk show host (d. 2016)
March 10 - Chris Axworthy, politician
March 10 - Kim Campbell, politician and first female Prime Minister of Canada
March 24 - Louise Lanctôt, convicted kidnapper and writer

April to June
April 3 - Jonathan Welsh, actor (d. 2005)
April 27 - Pauline Picard, politician (d. 2009)
May 3 - Doug Henning, magician, illusionist and escape artist (d. 2000)
May 4 - John Bosley, politician (d. 2022)
May 7 - Dave Barrow, politician (d. 2022)
May 12 
 Michael Ignatieff, Canadian politician, philosopher and historian
 Micheline Lanctôt, Canadian actress, director, and screenwriter
May 20 - Oscar Lathlin, politician (d. 2008)
May 25 - Doug Martindale, politician
May 28 - Lynn Johnston, cartoonist
June 10 - Michel Bastarache, lawyer, businessman, puisne justice on the Supreme Court of Canada
June 14 
 Vanessa Harwood, ballet dancer, choreographer, artistic director, teacher and actor
 Patrick Moore, founder member of Greenpeace
Neil Stevens, sports writer (d. 2022)
June 19 - John Ralston Saul, author and essayist
June 22 - Aude, writer

July to September
July 13 - Rosella Bjornson, airline pilot, first female pilot for a commercial airline in North America
July 18 - Steve Mahoney, politician and Minister
July 22
 Gilles Duceppe, politician
 Bill Matthews, politician
July 27 - Serge Bouchard, anthropologist and broadcaster (d. 2021)
August 8 - Ken Dryden, ice hockey player, politician, lawyer, businessman and author
August 13 – John Stocker, voice actor 
August 24 - Linda Hutcheon, literary critic and theorist
August 30 - Allan Rock, politician and diplomat
September 24 - R. H. Thomson, actor

October to December
October 3 - Carroll Morgan, boxer
October 13 - Jon Gerrard, politician and medical doctor
November 10 - Bryan Gibson, boxer
November 17 - Inky Mark, politician
November 22 - Jacques Saada, politician and Minister
November 28 - Bonnie Mitchelson, politician
December 27 - Mickey Redmond, ice hockey player and commentator
December 31 - Burton Cummings, musician and songwriter

Full date unknown
Russ Germain, radio presenter (d. 2009)
Olga Hrycak, former basketball player and basketball university coach
John Martin, broadcaster (d. 2006)

Deaths

January to June
January 7 - John Alexander Mathieson, jurist, politician and Premier of Prince Edward Island (b. 1863)

January 11 - Eva Tanguay, singer and entertainer (b. 1878)
February 6 – Henry Marshall Tory, university founder (b. 1864)
March 19 - Prudence Heward, painter (b. 1896)
June 10 - Alexander Bethune, politician and 12th Mayor of Vancouver (b. 1852)
June 25 - William Donald Ross, financier, banker and Lieutenant Governor of Ontario (b. 1869)
June 26 - R. B. Bennett, lawyer, businessman, politician, philanthropist and 11th Prime Minister of Canada (b. 1870)

July to December
July 2 - Clarence Lucas, composer, lyricist, conductor and music professor (b. 1866)
August 11 - Gerry McGeer, politician (b. 1888)
October 22 – Phoebe Amelia Watson, painter and curator (b. 1858)
November 14 - Walter Edward Foster, businessman, politician and 16th Premier of New Brunswick (b. 1873)
December 17 – William Johnston Tupper, politician, 12th Lieutenant Governor of Manitoba (b. 1862)
December 28 - Leonard Percy de Wolfe Tilley, lawyer, politician and 20th Premier of New Brunswick (b. 1870)

See also 
 List of Canadian films

Historical documents
"Truly desperate conditions" in Europe that weaken trade, plus Canadian domestic demand for U.S. goods, cause crisis in value of dollar

British trade deficit (e.g., over 20% of imports from Canada, but less than 5% of exports to Canada) necessitates loans, like £273,000,000 from Canada

U.S. President Truman says his country's general accord with Canada is "one part proximity and nine parts good will and common sense"

Ranking of allies relative to U.S. national security puts Canada eighth in priority for economic and military assistance

PM King's frustration at UN's weakness jeopardizes Canada's participation on Korea Commission (Note: questionable reference to Jews)

"Groundless assertions that certain individuals are warmongers" - Canada complains about heavy-handed Soviet rhetoric at UN

"Just following orders" defence at Nuremberg trials supported in outcome of 1840 U.S. prosecution of "Caroline" raider

Montreal Gazette editorial on political and, especially, economic issues to be worked out before Newfoundland's entry into Confederation

Canadian Polish Congress wants more Poles, including veterans for 6-10% of Canadian women unable to marry because of war brides and casualties

Repeal of Chinese Immigration Act, 1923 arises from Canadians' opinion that it is discriminatory and singles out war ally

Cabinet continues orders prohibiting "persons of Japanese race" from living or fishing in coastal British Columbia

Japanese Canadians criticize confiscated-property compensation process for ignoring realities of their forced evacuation

Major oil strike near Leduc, Alberta raises Imperial Oil share value 19% and pleases CPR and local farmers with mineral rights

Obstetrician argues that child bearing is every woman's biological destiny, but that mixed feelings make her psychologically unstable

Film: dramatized case study of woman whose psychological problems are attributed to her troubled childhood

"We often resorted there to pass the time" - based on his description, gardens of Champlain's Habitation at Port-Royal will be restored

Advertisement: bobby soxer excited about crossing Canada by train

Advertisement: lots of Rocky Mountain experiences for guests of Jasper Park Lodge in Jasper National Park

References 

 
Years of the 20th century in Canada
Canada
1947 in North America